Conus xanthocinctus is a species of sea snail, a marine gastropod mollusk in the family Conidae, the cone snails and their allies.

Like all species within the genus Conus, these snails are predatory and venomous. They are capable of "stinging" humans, therefore live ones should be handled carefully or not at all.

Taxonomy 
Conus xanthocinctus Petuch, 1986, was incorrectly listed as a synonym of Conus lemniscatus with the author noted as "Petuch, 1980", and it is recognized as a valid species, and an alternative representation in the genus Lamniconus.

References

 Tucker J.K. & Tenorio M.J. (2013) Illustrated catalog of the living cone shells. 517 pp. Wellington, Florida: MdM Publishing.

External links
 To World Register of Marine Species
 See Image at http://biology.burke.washington.edu/conus/recordview/record.php?ID=3140ll&tabs=51000111&frms=1&res=gallst&pglimit=X
 Cone Shells - Knights of the Sea

xanthocinctus
Gastropods described in 1986